is an action role-playing game released exclusively for the PlayStation 3. It is the thirteenth main installment of the Tales series and is developed by Namco Tales Studio with Namco Bandai Games as the publisher. The game was released in Japan on September 7, 2011, and was localized in North America and PAL region in August 2013. The game takes place in a fictional world called Rieze Maxia where humans and ethereal spirits live in harmony. It follows Jude Mathis and Milla Maxwell who elude government officials after sabotaging a weapon of mass destruction known as the Lance of Kresnik.

Tales of Xillias reception in Japan was highly positive. At the time of its release in Japan, it was the most preordered Tales game in the series and sold half a million copies in a week, before eventually shipping over  copies worldwide. The game also won awards from Sony and Famitsu. The English localization received positive reception for its battle system, neutral to positive reviews for its plot and characters, and criticism for the map designs. The sequel, Tales of Xillia 2, was released in November 2012 in Japan and in August 2014 in North America and PAL region.

Gameplay
Tales of Xillia consists primarily of two major areas: the field map and the battle screen. The field map is a realistically scaled 3D environment where the player character traverses and interacts with non-player characters, items, or mob avatars. On the field map, character interactions between the party can also be viewed in the form of a sketch story; these sketch stories are referred to as skits and consist of animated portraits and voice acting. When coming into contact with a mob avatar, the environment switches to the battle screen, a 3D representation of an area in which the player commands the characters in battles against the CPU-controlled mobs.

During battle sequences, the game uses the Dual Raid Linear Motion Battle System, a variation of the Linear Motion Battle used in the Tales series. Four characters from the party are chosen to battle and characters not controlled by a player are controlled by artificial intelligence with instructions set by the players beforehand. The enemy mob's number, appearances, behavior, vary and are dependent on the mob's avatar. Both sides' objective is to deplete the other side's health points (HP) using attacks and skills. When a party member's health falls to zero, the party member faints until revived with items, by a healer, or resting at an inn on the field map; Mobs with zero HP disappear from the arena. Killing all the mobs will yield experience points, items, and allows the player to return to the field map. If all four participating party members are defeated, a game over will occur. Skill and attribute development is based on a system of orbs placed on the nodes of a hexagonal web called the Lilium Orb. When characters level up, they receive GP which can then be allocated to the orbs on the web in a uni-linear path. Each orb activated contains either a new skill or an attribute upgrade.

Battles take place in real-time. Player actions include moving, dashing, standard attacks, and artes; artes are special attacks which consume "Technical Points" (TP), the in-game synonym for magic points. Dashing, standard attacks, and artes usage are also restricted by the "Assault Counter" (AC), a synonym for action points. Party members are able to link to each other to perform unified attacks called linked artes. While linked, the supporting partner provides unique abilities to the character, while also increasing the Linked Artes Gauge. When the Linked Artes Gauge is full, the player character can enter Over Limit which gives them immunity to stagger, unlimited AC, and allows them to use linked artes in succession.

Plot

Two millennia ago, humans developed spyrix, a power source which absorbs spirits. In response, the spirit Maxwell gathered humans, who share a symbiotic relationship with spirits, onto an isolated land protected by a barrier; the isolated land became known as Rieze Maxia and the outer lands as Elympios. As spirits are needed to sustain nature, Maxwell waits for the day all humans on Elympios die off before dispelling the barrier. Twenty years prior to the present, an Elympion cruise ship becomes trapped in Rieze Maxia, eventually forming a terrorist group known as Exodus. Exodus works with the Elympios military to find a way to destroy the barrier. In the present era, Rieze Maxia is ruled by two countries called Rashugal and Auj Oule. While the two countries appear to live in harmony, they both initiate black operations in attempts to conquer the other in hopes of uniting Rieze Maxia as a single country.

In the present, medical student Jude Mathis investigates a military research facility in order to search for his missing professor. There he witnesses a spyrix-powered weapon called the Lance of Kresnik absorb his professor. The military prep Jude as the next victim, but he is saved by Milla Maxwell, Maxwell's successor. In response, the military activates the lance which absorbs Milla's spirit companions forcing her and Jude to retreat. Jude and Milla decide to confront Rashugal's king who had endorsed the Lance's creation. During their travel, they are joined by Alvin, Elize Lutus, Rowen J. Illbert and Leia Rolando. After Rashugal's king is defeated, Exodus obtains and uses the Lance to temporarily disable the barrier protecting Rieze Maxia, allowing Elympios' army to invade. Assisted by Auj Oule's king, Gaius, the party defeats Exodus at the cost of Milla's life.

After mourning her death, Jude leads the party to meet Maxwell and attempts to persuade him to dispel the barrier and save Elympios. Reunited with Milla, who has been reborn as a spirit, they convince Maxwell of their cause. However, Gaius and the spirit named Muzét seal Maxwell within the Lance of Kresnik, intent on sustaining the barrier until all spyrixs are destroyed; Maxwell sends the party to Elympios before he is completely subdued. There, the party learns about Elympios' dependence on spyrix and an ongoing research on spyrite, a power source harmless to spirits. With renewed conviction, the party confronts and defeats Gaius and Muzét. Maxwell dispels the barrier and disperses its energy to temporarily power spyrixes until the completion of spyrites. The party returns to their daily lives with Jude joining a spyrite research team, Milla resuming her role as Maxwell, and Gaius uniting Rieze Maxia under his rule.

Development and release
The game began development after Tales of Hearts was completed. A Tales game for the PlayStation 3 was announced on July 28, 2010's Weekly Shonen Jump and officially announced by Namco Bandai Games on August 2, 2010; On December 15, 2010 Tales of Xillia was unveiled in Weekly Shonen Jump and its official website was launched. Its staff, battle system and two main characters were revealed along with the game's main theme, . Between January and March 2011, Namco released information about the other four playable characters. In May the game's release date, a Xillia themed PS3, and the game's theme song, "Progress" by Ayumi Hamasaki were revealed, with the Japanese vocals being retained in the Western release. Before the game's release, a Korean game guide of the game was leaked onto the internet forcing Namco to issue a response. Due to time constraints, some planned features were excluded such as an onsen scene and having Gaius or Muzét as playable characters. The game was released on September 8, 2011, and was made available on the Japanese PlayStation Store a year later. The game was re-released under PlayStation 3 The Best label on October 9, 2014.

In March 2012, Tales of Xillia was trademarked in Europe and North America. A Western localization was officially announced by Namco Bandai Games Europe on July 6, 2012, through Twitter. On November 5, 2012, Ted Tsung, the North American producer for Tales of Xillia, announced the completion of the English voice recordings. On the same day, Europe's localization was announced to have subtitles in English, French, Spanish, German, and Italian. In April 2013, Namco announced the game would be released in August for North America and PAL region; also announced was the collector's edition of the game. In North America, the first print of the game were released as a limited edition bundle. The game was translated by 8-4 and dubbed by Cup of Tea Productions.

Downloadable content
Tales of Xillia had several downloadable content (DLC) which changed a character's appearance or provided in-game bonuses such as items, currency, or levels. The majority of the DLC were released weekly between September 8 until October 6, 2011 on the PlayStation Store. Costumes were themed and released in sets; in order of release the sets were, Star Driver, The Idolmaster 2, swimwear, steward and maid, school, and Tales series. Accompanying these costume releases were hair styles, accessories, palette swaps, and in-game bonuses DLC. Two DLC codes were bundled with physical releases: Ayumi Hamasaki's album Five contains Milla's songstress costume; the first print of the game contains a Tales of Phantasia outfit for Jude and a Tales of Destiny outfit for Milla. The final DLC was the Santa Claus costume set and was released on the PlayStation Store on December 1, 2011.

In the English localization, the Tales of Phantasia and Tales of Destiny costumes were given with preorders of the collector's edition; North America's Limited Edition and the PAL region's day one edition also contained the codes. Excluding Star Driver, the Japanese PlayStation Store's contents were released bi-weekly for North America and PAL region between August 6 and September 3, 2013. The final DLC, the Santa Claus costume set, was released on November 26, 2013.

Media adaptions

Manga
Tales of Xillia spawned four manga adaptions: two anthology collections and two traditional manga series. Ichijinsha were the publishers for the anthology collections. Its two volumes were released on November 25, 2011, and February 25, 2012. Its three volumes were released between December 24, 2011, and July 25, 2012. The Jude manga has four volumes released between February 2012 and March 2013, while the Milla manga has five volumes between February 2012 and October 2013.

Books
Shueisha, Yamashita Books, and Enterbrain each published a strategy guide for the game. Tales of Xillia was adapted into a novel series under the same name. It is published by ASCII Media Works and three volumes were released between November 10, 2011, and March 10, 2012. A play diary by Famitsu was published by Enterbrain on December 8, 2011.  is a book by the game's character designers and was released on December 27, 2011, by Ichijinsha. It provides details on the characters' back story and how their design came to be. On the same day,  was released by Yamashita Books and expands on Tales of Xillias lore.

Audio CDs
Five drama CDs based on the game's plot were produced by Frontier Works.  volumes 1 and 2 were released on May 23 and June 20, 2012.  volumes 1 and 2 were released on September 26 and October 24, 2012.  was released on January 26, 2013, in a regular and limited edition. It contains a cameo from Tales of Xillia 2s Ludger Will Kresnik and Elle Mel Marta.  soundtrack was released by Avex Group on September 7, 2011, in a regular and limited edition; it peaked 31st on Oricon's charts.

Reception

At the time of its release in Japan, Tales of Xillia was the most preordered Tales game in the series and sold half a million copies in a week. In North America, Tales of Xillia was one of the top selling games on the PlayStation Network in August 2013. , the game has shipped over  copies worldwide. The game was re-released in Japan under the PlayStation 3 The Best label in 2014.

Due to the amount of sales, Sony awarded Tales of Xillia the Gold Prize during the PlayStation Awards; the game also received the User's Choice award from the PlayStation Awards online poll. Famitsus review of the game was highly positive; they praised the game for its attentive visuals, accessibility, and fast battle system. In the "Newtype Anime Awards" from 2011, Xillia won the "Game Opening Animation" award. The English localized version of the game was also a nominee for the Satellite Award for Outstanding Role Playing Game in 2013.

All English reviewers agreed the battle system was fast and engaging; however, Electronic Gaming Monthly, Game Informer, GameSpot, and PlayStation Official Magazine panned the map designs calling them repetitive, lifeless and bland. The plot received neutral to positive reception. Game Revolution wrote "There's a pleasing inertia to the way plotlines form, unfold, and reach a conclusion that propels our heroes ever-forward, never stopping long enough to feel meandering but never feeling rushed or forced either.", praising the narrative to be one of the qualities to the game. Game Informer described the plot as "investing" and liked the balance in tragic and lighthearted moments. Joystiq lauded the execution of the plot for avoiding the usual JRPG "info dumps" and how small plot-lines intertwined into a larger conflict. PlayStation Official Magazine considered the plot as average and called it a let-down compared to the combat system. Reviewers have also noted the dual-protagonist execution caused incoherency in Milla's story.

Reviewers had mixed opinions on the characters. Generally, reviewers liked the character interactions. IGN praised the diverse characters but panned Milla's English voice acting. Game Revolution felt the characters were relatable and agreed with IGN about Milla's voice noting it sounded robotic and forced. Electronic Gaming Monthly described the characters as rather normal and competent compared to the previous Tales games, adding that they could imagine the cast having lives and dreams outside of the party's journey. Edge described the character interactions as engaging, well written, and praised how the characters avoided the cliché found in manga and anime. Oppositely, PlayStation Official Magazine felt the characters "fall into the familiar anime archtypes" and that "flat voice acting and a melodramatic script" made it difficult to feel invested in the cast; Polygon agreed about the character archetypes and called it a lazy strategy used to make the characters understandable.

Notes and references

Notes

References

Primary references

External links
 Official United Kingdom website
 Official Japanese website 

2011 video games
Cooperative video games
Dengeki Bunko
Multiplayer and single-player video games
Action role-playing video games
PlayStation 3-only games
Xillia, Tales of
Terrorism in fiction
Video games with cel-shaded animation
Video games scored by Motoi Sakuraba
Video games developed in Japan
Video games featuring female protagonists
Video games with downloadable content
PlayStation 3 games
Video games related to anime and manga